Mouth of the Cirque de Salazie Important Bird Area  is a 1780 ha tract of land on the island of Réunion, a French territory in the western Indian Ocean.

Description
It lies north-east of the Piton des Neiges volcanic massif, consisting of the river gorges of the Bras de Caverne and Rivière du Mât that drain the forested Bélouve plateau and adjacent Salazie caldera respectively. The site contains stands of native forest in very rugged terrain at elevations ranging from 160 m up to 1430 m above sea level.

Birds
The site has been identified by BirdLife International as an Important Bird Area (IBA) because it supports a breeding colony of Audubon's shearwaters (300 breeding pairs) as well as populations of Réunion harriers, Mascarene swiftlets, Mascarene paradise flycatchers, Réunion bulbuls, Mascarene white-eyes, Réunion olive white-eyes and Réunion stonechats.

References

Important Bird Areas of Réunion
Seabird colonies